This is a list of people who have served as Custos Rotulorum of Wiltshire.

 Sir Richard Lyster bef. 1544–1553
 Sir John Thynne bef. 1558–1580
 Henry Herbert, 2nd Earl of Pembroke bef. 1584–1601
 Edward Seymour, 1st Earl of Hertford 1601–1621
 Sir Francis Seymour 1621 – bef. 1626
 William Seymour, 2nd Duke of Somerset bef. 1626–1646, 1660
 Philip Herbert, 4th Earl of Pembroke 1650
 Francis Seymour, 1st Baron Seymour of Trowbridge 1660–1664
 Charles Seymour, 2nd Baron Seymour of Trowbridge 1664–1665
 William Herbert, 6th Earl of Pembroke 1665–1674
 John Seymour, 4th Duke of Somerset 1674–1675
 Philip Herbert, 7th Earl of Pembroke 1675–1683
 Thomas Thynne, 1st Viscount Weymouth 1683–1688
 William Paston, 2nd Earl of Yarmouth 1688–1690
 Thomas Thynne, 1st Viscount Weymouth 1690–1706
 Evelyn Pierrepont, 1st Marquess of Dorchester 1706–1711
 Thomas Thynne, 1st Viscount Weymouth 1711–1714
 Evelyn Pierrepont, 1st Duke of Kingston 1714–1726
 Algernon Seymour, 7th Duke of Somerset 1726–1750
 Hon. Robert Sawyer Herbert 1750–1752
For later custodes rotulorum, see Lord Lieutenant of Wiltshire.

References

Institute of Historical Research - Custodes Rotulorum 1544-1646
Institute of Historical Research - Custodes Rotulorum 1660-1828

Wiltshire